Moribabougou  is a small town and rural commune in the Cercle of Kati in the Koulikoro Region of south-western Mali. It lies on the eastern outskirts of the greater Bamako area. In the 2009 census the commune had a population of 28,574.

History

Moribabougou hosted two pre-service trainings for Peace Corps/Mali volunteers, one in 1981 and the second in 1983. Don Lawder's 1997 Fishing in the Sky: The Education of Namory Keita was in part an account of his experience in the latter.

References

External links
.

Communes of Koulikoro Region